Below the Radar is the second album by British progressive rock band Breathing Space but is the third album to carry the Breathing Space name. This album was recorded during an interim period after the departure of guitarist Mark Rowen, and Liam Davison of Mostly Autumn fame (who played all the guitar tracks on Iain Jennings' solo album Breathing Space) recorded all the guitar tracks and played a few live shows with the band. This album showcases a much rockier sound than Coming Up for Air and has been well received by the Breathing Space fans.

Track listing
 "Below the Radar" (B. Jennings) – 4:12
 "Clear" (Teasdale) – 4:29
 "Lantern For a Smile" (I. Jennings/Rowen/Sparnenn) – 6:44
 "The Night Takes You Home" (I. Jennings/Rowen/Sparnenn) – 4:32
 "Run From Yourself" (I. Jennings/Sparnenn) – 2:47
 "Dusk" (I. Jennings/Sparnenn) – 5:38
 "Behind Closed Doors" (I. Jennings/Sparnenn) – 5:38
 "Drowning" (I. Jennings/Sparnenn) – 6:26
 "Questioning Eyes" (I. Jennings/Sparnenn) – 9:30

Personnel 
Olivia Sparnenn – lead and backing vocals, percussion
Liam Davison – lead, rhythm and acoustic guitars
Paul Teasdale – bass guitars, acoustic guitars (Track 2)
Iain Jennings – keyboards, backing vocals (5)
Ben Jennings – keyboards
Barry Cassells – drums

Additional personnel
Charlotte Scott – cello (9)
Marc Atkinson – backing vocals (3)

2009 albums
Breathing Space albums